John Farrelly may refer to:

 John Wilson Farrelly (1809–1860), Whig member of the U.S. House of Representatives from Pennsylvania
 John V. Farrelly (born 1954), Irish Fine Gael party politician, former TD and senator
 John Farrelly (Australian architect), architect in Queensland, Australia (see Penrhyn, Ipswich)
 John Farrelly (director), Irish writer, director and producer